Greenwood is a census-designated place in Logan Township, Blair County, Pennsylvania, United States.  It is located near I-99 and is adjacent in the northeast to the city of Altoona.  As of the 2010 census, the population was 2,458  residents. It is often considered a district of Altoona, as the addresses are listed as Altoona addresses and some of the avenues use Altoona's numbering system.

Demographics

References

External links

Census-designated places in Blair County, Pennsylvania
Census-designated places in Pennsylvania